The Autopista A3, also known as Autopista Havana-Melena, is a Cuban motorway linking Havana to Melena del Sur.

Route
The A3 is a dual carriageway with 4 lanes and has some at-grade intersections with rural roads. It starts in Havana, from an interchange of the Havana Beltway (A2), and continues through Mayabeque Province; crossing the western side of the municipality of San José de las Lajas, and ending on a provincial highway, 2 km west of  Melena del Sur.

See also

Roads in Cuba
Transport in Cuba
Infrastructure of Cuba

References

External links

A3
Transport in Havana
Mayabeque Province